Filippo Casagrande (born 28 July 1973, in Florence) is a former Italian racing cyclist. He is the brother of Francesco Casagrande and Stefano Casagrande. He is most notable for winning a stage of the 1995 Giro d'Italia.

Major results

1994
1st Gran Premio Industria e Commercio Artigianato Carnaghese
1995
1st stage 5 Giro d'Italia
1996
1st stage 4 Tirreno–Adriatico
1st stages 2, 4, and 5 Regio-Tour
1st Montecarlo-Alassio
1st Coppa Ugo Agostoni
1st stages 2 and 5 Trofeo dello Stretto
2nd Gran Premio Industria e Commercio di Prato
2nd Milano–Vignola
3rd Trofeo Melinda
1997
2nd Memorial Nencini
1998
6th Milan–San Remo

References

1973 births
Living people
Cyclists from Florence
Italian male cyclists
Italian Giro d'Italia stage winners